This is a list of numbered roads in the United Counties of Leeds and Grenville, Ontario. 

Leeds and Grenville
Transport in Leeds and Grenville United Counties